Britland is a surname. Notable people with the surname include:

 Hannah Britland (born 1990), British actress and model
 Mary Ann Britland (1847–1886), English serial killer

English-language surnames